Miyauchi is a Hiroden station on Hiroden Miyajima Line, located in Kushido, Hatsukaichi, Hiroshima.

Routes
From Miyauchi Station, there is one of Hiroden Streetcar routes.
 Hiroshima Station - Hiroden-miyajima-guchi Route

Connections
█ Miyajima Line

Hatsukaichi-shiyakusyo-mae (Hera) — Miyauchi — JA Hiroshimabyoin-mae

Other services connections

JR lines
JR lines connections at Miyauchikushido Station
Hiroden Miyauchi Station is located to the south from JR Miyauchikushido Station, 3 minutes walk from the station.

Around station
JR Miyauchikushido Station

History
Opened on July 15, 1925.
Moved the present place in 1945.

See also
Hiroden Streetcar Lines and Routes

References

Miyauchi Station
Railway stations in Japan opened in 1925